Jack English (19 March 1923 – 1985) was a professional footballer who played for Northampton Town and Gravesend and Northfleet as a forward.

His dad was also called Jack English and managed Northampton between 1931 and 1935.

References

1923 births
1985 deaths
English Football League players
English footballers
Northampton Town F.C. players
Association football wingers
Footballers from South Shields
Bristol City F.C. players
Date of death missing
Ebbsfleet United F.C. players